Tanoor is a mandal in  the Nirmal district of the Indian state of Telangana. It is located in Tanoor mandal of Nirmal revenue division. It was a part of the Adilabad district prior to the re-organisation of districts in the state.

Geography

References

External links
Adilabad Mandals and their Gram Panchayats (map)

Villages in Adilabad district